Rudolf Vilim (15 June 1913 – February 1959) was a Swiss canoeist who competed in the 1936 Summer Olympics.

In 1936 he and his partner Werner Klingelfuss finished fifth in the K-2 1000 metres competition.

References

Sports-reference.com profile

External links
 

1913 births
Canoeists at the 1936 Summer Olympics
Olympic canoeists of Switzerland
1959 deaths
Swiss male canoeists